Robert Gaillard (November 14, 1868 – September 24, 1941) was an American stage and film actor. He also directed a number of films during the silent era.

Selected filmography

Actor
 Cardinal Wolsey (1912)
 As You Like It (1912)
 The Lion's Bride (1913)
 Mr. Barnes of New York (1914)
 The Man Who Couldn't Beat God (1915)
 The Two Edged Sword (1916)
 The Surprises of an Empty Hotel (1916)
 Indiscretion (1917)
 The Maelstrom (1917)
 Within the Law (1917)
 The Courage of Silence (1917)
The Message of the Mouse (1917)
The Grell Mystery (1917)
The Stolen Treaty (1917)
 The Green God (1918)
 Hoarded Assets (1918)
The Golden Goal (1918)
 The Adventure Shop (1919)
 In Honor's Web (1919)
The Man Who Won (1919)
Silent Strength (1919)
 The Broadway Bubble (1920)
 The Flaming Clue (1920)
The Birth of a Soul (1920)
 What's Your Reputation Worth? (1921)
 The Charming Deceiver (1921)
 Princess Jones (1921)
 Christopher Columbus (1923)
 The Wreck of the Singapore (1928)
 Baleydier (1932)

Director
 Some Good in All (1911)
 Mr. Barnes of New York (1914)
 The Man Who Couldn't Beat God - co-director (1915)

References

Bibliography
 Leonhard Gmür. Rex Ingram: Hollywood's Rebel of the Silver Screen. Impressum, 2013.

External links

1868 births
1941 deaths
20th-century American male actors
American male film actors
American male stage actors
American film directors
American male writers